Robert Edmond Gregg (4 February 1904 – 1991) was an English professional footballer who played as an inside forward. He played for Darlington, Sheffield Wednesday, Birmingham and Chelsea in the Football League, making nearly 200 appearances in total.

Having scored at a goal every two games for Darlington, Gregg joined Sheffield Wednesday  before the 1928–29 season, and contributed to them winning that year's First Division championship. The following season, he lost his place to the high-scoring Harry Burgess, and in January 1931 he joined Birmingham for a fee of £2,200. He played his part in that season's FA Cup campaign, and "scored" a goal in the 1931 FA Cup Final which was disallowed for offside. He moved on to Chelsea in September 1933 for a fee of £1,500, finishing his career with Boston United in the Midland League and with Sligo Rovers in Ireland during the Second World War.

Gregg also made 1 WW2 Guest appearance for Clapton Orient on 26 August 1944, played at Fratton Park against Portsmouth, a 5–1 defeat, before a 10 000 crowd. a report on the match in a local Portsmouth paper stated that Gregg had a shot on six minutes which was saved by the Pompey goalkeeper Harry Walker. In November 1945 he was stationed at the Colchester Garrison and he made 3 appearances for then Southern League side Colchester United, his debut came at the age of 41 years and 272 days in the FA Cup against Wisbech Town.

Honours
with Sheffield Wednesday
Football League First Division champions: 1929
with Birmingham
FA Cup finalist: 1931

References

1904 births
1991 deaths
People from Ferryhill
Footballers from County Durham
English footballers
Association football forwards
Spennymoor United F.C. players
Darlington F.C. players
Sheffield Wednesday F.C. players
Birmingham City F.C. players
Chelsea F.C. players
Colchester United F.C. players
Boston United F.C. players
Sligo Rovers F.C. players
League of Ireland players
Date of death missing
Place of death missing
Ferryhill Athletic F.C. players
FA Cup Final players